Robert Andrew "Bob" Hawkesworth (born February 18, 1951) is a Canadian politician and a former member of the Legislative Assembly of Alberta.

Life and career
Hawkesworth was born in Saskatoon, Saskatchewan. He attended the University of Alberta and the University of Calgary before being elected in 1980 to Calgary City Council as alderman for Ward 3. He was elected to the Legislative Assembly of Alberta in the 1986 general election to represent the riding of Calgary Mountain View for the Alberta New Democratic Party. His Progressive Conservative (PC) opponent (whom he defeated by just 257 votes) in that election was Jim Prentice, a future federal government minister and Premier of Alberta. Hawkesworth was re-elected in the 1989 election before being defeated in the 1993 election by Mark Hlady. He returned to City Council and served as alderman for Ward 4 until October 18, 2010.

Hawkesworth received the 2000 Calgary United Way Spirits of Gold Award for co-chairing the Calgary Homeless Initiative and was named one of Alberta's 50 Most Influential People by Alberta Venture Magazine.

Hawkesworth ran for Mayor in the Calgary civic election held on October 18, 2010, which was won by Naheed Nenshi.  He withdrew on October 13 to support Barb Higgins.  Under Calgary's electoral rules a candidate can not run for multiple positions meaning Ward 4 did not have an incumbent on the ballot.

In July 2015, Hawkesworth won the NDP nomination for the by-election in the Calgary-Foothills district, due in September of that year. The seat had been vacated by Jim Prentice (whom Hawkesworth had defeated almost 30 years earlier) following the PCs defeat by the NDP at the 2015 general election. But in the by-election on September 3, 2015, he lost out to Wildrose candidate Prasad Panda.

Electoral history

2015 Calgary-Foothills by-election

1993 Alberta general election

1989 Alberta general election

1986 Alberta general election

References

1951 births
Living people
Alberta New Democratic Party MLAs
Calgary city councillors
Politicians from Saskatoon
University of Alberta alumni
University of Calgary alumni